Jefferson Township is one of twelve townships in Pulaski County, Indiana, United States. As of the 2010 census, its population was 545 and it contained 230 housing units.

Jefferson Township was organized in 1851, and named after Thomas Jefferson, third President of the United States.

Geography

Adjacent townships
 Rich Grove Township (north)
 Franklin Township (northeast)
 Monroe Township (east)
 Indian Creek Township (southeast)
 Beaver Township (south)
 Salem Township (southwest)
 White Post Township (west)
 Cass Township (northwest)

Cemeteries
The township contains these three cemeteries: Burroughs, Idle and Koster.

Major highways
  Indiana State Road 14
  Indiana State Road 39

Education
 Eastern Pulaski Community School Corporation
 West Central School Corporation

Jefferson Township residents may obtain a free library card from the Pulaski County Public Library in Winamac.

Political districts
 Indiana's 2nd congressional district
 State House District 20
 State Senate District 18

References
 United States Census Bureau 2008 TIGER/Line Shapefiles
 United States Board on Geographic Names (GNIS)
 IndianaMap

External links
 Indiana Township Association
 United Township Association of Indiana

Townships in Pulaski County, Indiana
Townships in Indiana